Malin Reuterwall (born 10 December 1990) is a Swedish football goalkeeper for Grindavik of the Icelandic Urvalsdeild Kvenna. She is included in the Sweden women's national football team.

Club career
Reuterwall began her career with local club BK30, playing in the first-team at age of 16. In April 2011 Umeå signed Reuterwall, on the recommendation of national team goalkeeper coach Elisabeth Leidinge. She joined Umeå in preference to several other interested clubs, where she became the regular understudy to the experienced Caroline Jönsson.

Umeå secured Reuterwall's services for another season when she extended her contract with the club in December 2014.

International career
In September 2013 coach Pia Sundhage gave Reuterwall her debut call-up to the national team, for a home World Cup qualifying match against Poland. At that point Reuterwall had won eight caps for Sweden at the U23 level. Her first experience at the international level was gained as Sweden's third-choice goalkeeper at the 2010 FIFA U-20 Women's World Cup.

Reuterwall won her debut senior cap in a 1–1 draw with Canada in November 2014.

References

External links

 
 
 Umeå IK player profile 

Swedish women's footballers
Sweden women's international footballers
1990 births
Living people
Damallsvenskan players
Umeå IK players
Women's association football goalkeepers
Sportspeople from Västerås